Evgeny Belokhvostikov (born February 1, 1992) is a Russian ice hockey defenceman. He is currently playing with HC Sarov of the Supreme Hockey League (VHL).

Belokhvostikov made his Kontinental Hockey League debut playing with Torpedo Nizhny Novgorod during the 2013–14 KHL season.

References

External links

1992 births
Living people
HC Lada Togliatti players
Metallurg Novokuznetsk players
Russian ice hockey defencemen
Torpedo Nizhny Novgorod players
People from Zavolzhye, Nizhny Novgorod Oblast
Sportspeople from Nizhny Novgorod Oblast